Hemiarcha is a genus of moths in the family Gelechiidae.

Species
 Hemiarcha bleptodes Turner, 1919
 Hemiarcha caliginosa Turner, 1919
 Hemiarcha macroplaca (Lower, 1893)
 Hemiarcha melanogastra Diakonoff, 1954
 Hemiarcha metableta Turner, 1933
 Hemiarcha polioleuca Turner, 1919
 Hemiarcha tetrasticta Turner, 1919
 Hemiarcha thermochroa (Lower, 1893)

References

 
Gelechiinae